James Arnold Bennington (born May 22, 1970 in Columbus, Ohio) is an American jazz drummer and avant-garde musician based in Chicago, Illinois.

Biography
Born in Columbus, Ohio, in 1970, James Bennington lived in Detroit, Michigan until 1978 when he relocated to Houston, Texas. He began music studies on clarinet while attending Elementary School before switching to drums at age thirteen. Bennington's experience has come from private study, marching and concert bands both middle and high school, work as a sideman, and as a band leader with his group, Colour and Sound.

Early musical experiences include participation in several jazz and blues sessions in Texas throughout the late 1980s and early 1990s. Bennington studied with Elvin Jones for ten years beginning in 1994 and served as band manager / drum tech from 2000–2002 on tours in the U.S. and Europe.

He resided on the West Coast from 1998-2006 then in Chicago from 2006–present. Bennington has performed throughout the U.S., Canada, Europe, and South America. He has played and recorded in the jazz and improvised music communities for over a quarter of a century. In Chicago, he has been an active contributor to the music scene playing extensively with Ed Schuller (Bassist), Brian Smith (Bassist), Fredrick Jackson Jr. (Saxophonist), Samuel Hasting (guitarist), Jim Baker (piano), Mike W Harmon (bassist), Davi Priest (bassist), Steve Cohn (Pianist), Dustin Laurenzi (Saxophonist), Ben Schmidt-Swartz (Saxophonist), and Artie Black (Saxophonist) among many others.

Most notably, Bennington was a featured performer at the 30th Annual Chicago Jazz Festival, Fred Anderson's Velvet Lounge, and the Tampon-Galerie in Paris,France in 2008. Bennington is proudly endorsed by Dream Cymbals and Gongs, Inc.

Bennington's most current release was included in Down Beat Magazine'''s Best Recordings of 2014.

RecordingsContemplation, (1998) Jimmy Bennington, Liner notes by Delfeayo Marsalis, ThatSwan! Records 1000Midnight Choir, (2003) Jimmy Bennington, OA2 Records 22007Our Dialogue, Live at the Tugboat, vol. V (2004) Jimmy Bennington/ David Haney, CD/DVD, ThatSwan! Records 1003
"Jazz Kaleidoscope; solo drums live (2005), Jimmy Bennington, ThatSwan! Records 1004
"Portraits and Silhouettes"  (2005) Jimmy Bennington/ Julian Priester,ThatSwan! Records 1005Another Friend; The Music Of Herbie Nichols (2005), Jimmy Bennington Trio w David Haney/ Michael Bisio,ThatSwan! Records 1006
"The Spirits at Belle's" (2009) Jimmy Bennington/ Perry Robinson Quartet, Cadence Jazz Records 1219
"Symbols Strings and Magic" (2010) Jimmy Bennington Trio w Perry Robinson/ Ed Schuller CIMP Records 379
"No Lunch in Hackensack" (2010) Jimmy Bennington/ Steve Cohn, Unseen Rain Records 9979
"One More Beautiful Ballad" (2011) Jimmy Bennington Trio w Daniel Carter/ Ed Schuller  CIMP Records
"Sad Drums/ BItter Drums: Ballad for Sierra Leone" Jimmy Bennington/ Seth Paynter, ThatSwan!sing#001
"The Walk to Montreuil" (2013) Jimmy Bennington Trio w Benjamin Duboc/ Jobic LeMasson, Cadence Jazz Records
"Exotic Coda" (2014) Jimmy Bennington/ Demian Richardson Trio w Ken Filiano, CIMP Records
"Tear it Down, Then Play a Ballad" (2015) Jimmy Bennington Colour and Sound w Daniel Carter/ Brian Smith, ThatSwan!sing#002
"Albany Park" (2018) Jimmy Bennington/ Steve Cohn, SLAM Records LC05526 
"A Little While in Chicago" (2018) Jimmy Bennington Colour and Sound w Fredrick Jackson Jr./ Jerome Croswell/ Ed Schuller, CIMP 417
"Boom! Live at the Bop Shop" (2018) Jimmy Bennington Colour and Sound w Fredrick Jackson Jr./ Jerome Croswell/ Ed Schuller, CIMPoL 5043

References

 Further reading 
Gold, Jack; "Meet Drummer Jimmy Bennington", All About Jazz, April, 2005
Dupont, David; "Jimmy Bennington - Our Dialogue + Midnight Choir", One Final Note Review, July 2005
DeLaurenti, Chris; "James Bennington", The Stranger, Seattle, Washington, February 9, 2006
"Jimmy Bennington/Julian Priester - Portraits and Silhouettes", All About Jazz New York, Oct 2007
Porter, Lewis; Encyclopedia of Jazz Musicians compiled by at Rutgers University, 2007
Reich, Howard; "Priester Returns to the South Side Full of Adventure", Chicago Tribune, July 8, 2007
Kremsky, Stuart; "Portraits and Silhouettes - Jimmy Bennington/ Julian Priester", Cadence'', April May June 2008
Art Lange; "Symbols Strings and Magic" CIMP 379 Review, May 2010
Richard Lang; "Jimmy Bennington Interview", Cadence Jazz Magazine, Oct/ Nov/ Dec 2010
Bill Meyer; "The Walk to Montreuil", Dusted Magazine, Nov. 2014
Michael Ricci; "Take Five with Jimmy Bennington", All About Jazz- New York, Jan. 2014
Alain Drouot; "Down Beat Magazine Best Albums of 2014", Down Beat Magazine, Jan. 2015
Guitar Center Newsletter, "Instructor Spotlight", Dec. 2017
Ken Weiss; "Jazz Stories", Cadence Magazine, Jan. 2018

External links
Official website
Midnight Choir / Our Dialogue Review
All About Jazz Interview with Jimmy Bennington: April 16, 2005
All About Jazz New York- "Take Five with Jimmy Bennington": January 15, 2015

1970 births
American jazz drummers
American experimental musicians
Living people
Musicians from Chicago
20th-century American drummers
American male drummers
Jazz musicians from Illinois
21st-century American drummers
20th-century American male musicians
21st-century American male musicians
American male jazz musicians